1000 Miles from Christmas is a  Spanish Christmas comedy film directed by Álvaro Fernández Armero which stars Tamar Novas and Andrea Ros. A Netflix original film, it was released on 24 December 2021.

Plot 
A Scrooge-like Christmas-abhoring man, Raúl, is tasked to audit a Turrón-making factory in a remote Christmas-loving village, where he also faces the prospect of sharing a roof with Paula, the local teacher, hellbent on staging the largest living nativity scene ever.

Cast

Production 
1000 Miles from Christmas was directed by Álvaro Fernández Armero and written by Francisco Arnal and Daniel Monedero. Produced by Kiko Martínez (Nadie es Perfecto PC), shooting began on 22 December 2020 in Madrid. Production moved to the Pyrenees (province of Lleida and province of Huesca), shooting in Arties (Aran Valley) and Benasque. Footage was also shot in various locations across the Madrid region and the province of Segovia.

Release 
A Netflix original film, 1000 Miles from Christmas is slated for a 24 December 2021 release date.

See also 
 List of Spanish films of 2021
 List of Christmas films

References 

Spanish Christmas comedy films
2020s Christmas comedy films
Films shot in the Community of Madrid
Films shot in the province of Guadalajara
Films shot in the province of Lleida
Films shot in the province of Segovia
Films shot in Madrid
Spanish romantic comedy films
2021 films
2021 romantic comedy films
2020s Spanish-language films
2020s Spanish films